The Hunsecker's Mill Covered Bridge is a covered bridge located in Lancaster County, Pennsylvania, United States. The bridge has a single span, wooden, double Burr arch trusses design.

The bridge's WGCB Number is 38-36-06. Unlike most historic covered bridges in the county, it is not listed on the National Register of Historic Places. It is located at  (40.08717, -76.24750). The bridge divides the road on which it is upon into Hunsecker Road (East) in Upper Leacock Township and Hunsicker Road (West) in Manheim Township.

History 
The original bridge was built in 1843 by John Russell at a cost of $1,988. It was and is a double Burr Arch truss system. It has been swept away in flooding numerous times, most recently in 1972 after Hurricane Agnes.  Waters lifted the original structure off its abutments and carried it downstream. In 1973, following destruction from the hurricane, it was rebuilt at a cost of $321,302.Note:  Its length of 180 feet makes it the longest single-span covered bridge of Lancaster County's 29 covered bridges. While Schenck's covered bridge (Big Chiques #4) is one of 3 bridges with horizontal siding boards, the Hunsecker's Mill bridge may be the only one in Lancaster County with horizontal floor boards which give a unique vibration upon crossing, it is a little bumpy for cyclists at speed, proceed with some caution. A detailed scale model (~7' long), complete with stone abutments, was donated to the Lancaster Mennonite Historical Society and may be available for viewing.

Dimensions 
Length:  total length
Width:  total width
Overhead clearance:

Gallery

See also
Burr arch truss
List of crossings of the Conestoga River
List of Lancaster County covered bridges

References 

Covered bridges in Lancaster County, Pennsylvania
Bridges completed in 1843
Bridges over the Conestoga River
Road bridges in Pennsylvania
1843 establishments in Pennsylvania
Wooden bridges in Pennsylvania
Burr Truss bridges in the United States